Tater tots are grated potatoes formed into small cylinders and deep-fried, often served as a side dish. The name "tater tot" is a registered trademark of the American frozen food company Ore-Ida, but is often used as a generic term. "Tater" is short for potato.

History
Tater tots were invented in 1953 when American frozen food company Ore-Ida founders F. Nephi Grigg, Golden Grigg, and Ross Erin Butler Sr. were trying to figure out what to do with leftover slivers of cut-up potatoes.  They chopped up the slivers, added flour and seasoning, then pushed the mash through holes and sliced off pieces of the extruded mixture. The product was first offered commercially in stores in 1956.

The name "Tater Tot" is a registered trademark of Ore-Ida—which has been a subsidiary of Heinz since 1965—but has become so widely associated with the dish that it is often used as a generic term. "Tater" is short for potato. The name "Tater Tot" was created in the 1950s, and soon trademarked by a member of the Ore-Ida company's research committee who used a thesaurus to come up with an alliterative name.

Originally, the product was very inexpensive; according to advertising lectures at Iowa State University, people did not buy it at first because there was no perceived value. When the price was raised, people began buying it.

Since at least 2016, vegetable companies (like the Green Giant brand) have introduced "veggie tots" which seek to substitute more nutritionally dense vegetables (e.g. broccoli and cauliflower) for the potato.

Usage

Asia 
Tater tots, locally known as mat-gamja, are a common bunsik item in Korea. It is often served in a paper cup, with drizzled sweet gochujang-based sauce.

Europe 
In the United Kingdom, Ross Frozen Foods once produced "Oven Crunchies" which are no longer available, although generic versions remain widely available.

North America
In Canada, McCain Foods Limited calls its line "Tasti Taters".

In the United States, tater tots are common at school-lunch counters and cafeterias. They are also sold in the frozen food sections of grocery stores. Some fast-food restaurants also offer them.

Supermarket chain Safeway sells a generic brand of tater tots known as "Tater Treats". Cascadian Farm calls its line "Spud Puppies". Sonic drive-in also features tater tots on their regular menu: available toppings include cheese and chili. Sonic also sells "Cheesy Tots", coin-shaped tots that contain melted cheese and potatoes. Several restaurants in the Pacific Northwest offer a nacho version of tots known as "totchos", covered in nacho cheese sauce and toppings. Totchos were invented by publican Jim Parker in Portland, Oregon.

Some Mexican-style fast-food restaurants offer seasoned tater tots: Taco Time and Señor Frog's call them "Mexi-Fries", while Taco Bell used to sell them as "Mexi-Nuggets" and "Border Fries". Taco Mayo in the Southwest offers round disc-shaped tater tots called "Potato Locos". Taco John's also has coin shaped tots called "Potato Olés".

Food franchises Potato Corner and Papa John’s also offer tater tots in select locations, though in the latter case these are branded as ‘Potato Tots’.

Oceania 
In Australia and New Zealand, they are known as "potato gems", "potato royals" or "potato pom-poms". The New Zealand Pizza Hut franchise offers "Hash Bites" as a side dish, available alone or with an aioli dipping sauce.

See also

 
 
 
 
 

 
 
 Dumpling

References

External links
 

Fast food
Frozen food brands
Heinz brands
Potato dishes
Products introduced in 1953
American inventions